Stade Gabèsien or Stayda is a Tunisian football and basketball club from Gabès, founded since 1957. The club is playing in the Tunisian Professional League 1.

References

External links 
 

 
Football clubs in Tunisia
Association football clubs established in 1957
1957 establishments in Tunisia
Sports clubs in Tunisia